Forbidden Company is a 1932 American pre-Code  drama film directed by Richard Thorpe and starring Sally Blane, John Darrow and John St. Polis.

Cast
 Sally Blane as Barbara Blake  
 John Darrow as Jerry Grant  
 John St. Polis as David Grant 
 Myrtle Stedman as Mrs. Henrietta Grant  
 Josephine Dunn as Harriet Brown  
 Dorothy Christy as Louelle Fenwick  
 Bryant Washburn as Fletcher  
 Norma Drew as Diane Grant

References

Bibliography
 Pitts, Michael R. Poverty Row Studios, 1929-1940. McFarland & Company, 2005.

External links
 

1932 films
1932 drama films
1930s English-language films
American drama films
Films directed by Richard Thorpe
American black-and-white films
Chesterfield Pictures films
1930s American films